John Alva Keel, born Alva John Kiehle (March 25, 1930 – July 3, 2009) was an American journalist and influential UFOlogist who is best known as author of The Mothman Prophecies.

Early life
Keel was born in Hornell, New York, the son of a small-time bandleader. His parents separated and he was raised by his grandparents. He was interested in magic and had his first story published in a magicians' magazine at age 12. He left school at the age of 16 after taking all the science courses. 

He worked as a freelance contributor to newspapers, scriptwriter for local radio and television outlets, and author of pulp articles such as "Are You A Repressed Sex Fiend?" He served in the US Army during the Korean War on the staff of the American Forces Network at Frankfurt, Germany. He claimed that while in the Army he was trained in psychological warfare as a propaganda writer.

Career
After leaving the military he worked as a foreign radio correspondent in Paris, Berlin, Rome and Egypt.

In 1957, he published Jadoo, a book describing his time in Egypt and India investigating the Indian rope trick and the legendary yeti. In 1966 he produced the "spy and superhero" spoof novel The Fickle Finger of Fate. Influenced by writers such as Charles Fort, he began contributing articles to Flying Saucer Review and took up investigating UFOs and assorted Forteana as a full-time pursuit. Keel analyzed what he called "windows" and "waves" (or flaps, as they are often called) of reported UFO events, concluding that a disproportionate number occurred on Wednesdays and Saturdays.  A member of the Screenwriters Guild, Keel reportedly wrote scripts for Get Smart, The Monkees, Mack & Myer for Hire, and Lost in Space.

In 1967, Keel popularized the term "men in black" in an article for the men's adventure magazine Saga, entitled "UFO Agents of Terror".

Rejection of Extraterrestrial hypothesis
Like contemporary 1960s researchers such as J. Allen Hynek and Jacques Vallée, Keel was initially hopeful that he could somehow validate the prevailing extraterrestrial visitation hypothesis. However, after one year of investigations, Keel concluded that the extraterrestrial hypothesis was untenable. Indeed, both Hynek and Vallée eventually arrived at a similar conclusion. As Keel himself wrote: 

I abandoned the extraterrestrial hypothesis in 1967 when my own field investigations disclosed an astonishing overlap between psychic phenomena and UFOs... The objects and apparitions do not necessarily originate on another planet and may not even exist as permanent constructions of matter. It is more likely that we see what we want to see and interpret such visions according to our contemporary beliefs.

In UFOs: Operation Trojan Horse and The Eighth Tower Keel argues that a non-human or spiritual intelligence source has staged whole events over a long period of time in order to propagate and reinforce certain erroneous belief systems. For example, monsters, ghosts and demons, the fairy faith in Middle Europe, vampire legends, mystery airships in 1897, mystery aeroplanes of the 1930s, mystery helicopters, anomalous creature sightings, poltergeist phenomena, balls of light, and UFOs; Keel conjectured that ultimately all of these anomalies are a cover for the real phenomenon. He used the term "ultraterrestrials" to describe UFO occupants he believed to be non-human entities capable of taking on whatever form they want.

In Our Haunted Planet, Keel discussed the seldom-considered possibility that the alien "visitors" to Earth are not visitors at all, but an advanced Earth civilization, which may or may not be human. Interdimensional life is also considered.

Keel took no position on the ultimate purpose of the phenomenon other than that the UFO intelligence seems to have a long-standing interest in interacting with the human race.

The Mothman Prophecies
	 
His 1975 book The Mothman Prophecies was Keel's account of his investigation into alleged sightings in and around Point Pleasant, West Virginia of a huge, winged creature called "Mothman." The book combines Keel's account of receiving strange phone calls with reports of mutilated pets and culminates with the December 15, 1967, collapse of the Silver Bridge across the Ohio River.

The book was widely popularized as the basis of a 2002 film of the same name starring Richard Gere, Will Patton, Laura Linney and Alan Bates. Gere and Bates played two parts of Keel's personality. Bates's character is named "Leek," which is "Keel" spelled backwards; Gere's newspaper journalist character is named "John Klein," also a play on Keel's name.

In the May/June 2002 issue of Skeptical Inquirer, journalist John C. Sherwood, a former business associate of UFO researcher Gray Barker, published an analysis of private letters between Keel and Barker during the period of Keel's investigation. In the article, "Gray Barker's Book of Bunk," Sherwood reported finding significant differences between what Keel wrote at the time of his investigation and what he wrote in his first book about the Mothman reports, raising questions about the book's accuracy. Sherwood also reported that Keel, who was well known for writing humorous and outrageous letters to friends and associates, would not assist him in clarifying the differences.

Later years and impact
Prolific and imaginative, Keel was considered a significant influence within the UFO and Fortean genre.

For many years, Keel resided in the Upper West Side of New York City. He was a lifelong bachelor.

Keel died on July 3, 2009, in New York City, at the age of 79.

Works
 Jadoo (1957)
 The Fickle Finger of Fate (Fawcett, 1966)
 Operation Trojan Horse (1970); reprinted as Why UFOs (1978)
 Strange Creatures From Time and Space (1970); reprinted as The Complete Guide to Mysterious Beings (1994)
 Our Haunted Planet (1971)
 The Flying Saucer Subculture (1973)
 The Mothman Prophecies (1975)
 The Eighth Tower (1975); published in Britain as The Cosmic Question (1978)
 Disneyland of the Gods (1988)
 The Best of John Keel (Paperback 2006) (Collection of Keel's Fate Magazine articles)
 Flying Saucer to the Center of Your Mind: Selected Writings of John A. Keel (2013)
 The Outer Limits of the Twilight Zone: Selected Writings of John A. Keel (2013)
 Searching For the String: Selected Writings of John A. Keel (2014)
 The Great Phonograph in the Sky: Selected Writings of John A. Keel (2015)
 The Perspicacious Percipient: How to Investigate UFOs and Other Insane Urges - Selected Writings of John A. Keel (2015)
 The Passionate Percipient: Illusions I Have Known And Loved - Selected Writings of John A. Keel (2015)
 Pursuing the Addenda: Supernatural Reports From the Natural World (2016)

References
Notes

External links
 John Keel - Daily Telegraph obituary
 Fortean Times 1992 interview (archival)
 John Keel magazine articles (archival)
 John A Keel's Thoughts on The Philadelphia Experiment
 Mothman Central
 SciFi Online Interview with Keel (archival)
 The Great UFO Wave of '73: Interview with John A. Keel
 FortFest tapes
 Ultraterrestrials: Do they walk among us?, article by Ken Korczak at Unexplained Mysteries, 26 March 2006
 John Keel website with bibliography and biographical details
 Ben Robinson tribute (archival)

1930 births
2009 deaths
People from Hornell, New York
American fortean writers
American UFO writers
JFK-UFO conspiracy theories
Forteana
Cryptozoologists
Mothman
Parapsychologists
Ufologists
United States Army soldiers
United States Army personnel of the Korean War
People from the Upper West Side